The al-Hamza Division is a Syrian rebel group in northwestern Syria affiliated with the Syrian National Army, trained and equipped by the United States, the United Kingdom and Turkey as part of the Syrian Train and Equip Program. Formed in 2013, it cooperates with the Turkish Armed Forces in the Turkish occupation of northern Syria.

History

2013
The Hamza Division was originally formed as the Hamza Brigade of the Free Syrian Army (FSA) in the southern countryside of the Hasakah Governorate in northeast Syria in 2013.

2016
On 23 April 2016, five FSA groups based in the town of Mare' in the northern Aleppo Governorate countryside, the Hamza Brigade, the Dhi Qar Brigade, the Northern Thunder Brigade, the Mare Resistance Brigade, and the Special Operations Brigade merged into the Hamza Division, citing "interests of unity" and proclaiming its intention to fight the "crime and terror" of the Islamic State of Iraq and the Levant (ISIL) and the Syrian government. Under the command of Syrian Army defector Lt. Sayf Balud ("Sayf Abu Bakr"), the factions receive military support from CJTF-OIR, the international coalition against ISIL.

In June 2016, the Northern Thunder Brigade received BGM-71 TOW missiles from CJTF-OIR. Also that month, a Syrian Turkmen group called the "Samarkand Brigade", named after the city in Uzbekistan, joined the Hamza Division.

During Operation Euphrates Shield in late August, the Hamza Division became one of the first FSA groups to enter Jarabulus from Karkamış. Sayf Balud was among those who followed behind Turkish Land Forces tanks and troops and entered Jarabulus in the morning of the first day of the operation, reaching the city center by afternoon. He later gave a speech to residents in Jarabulus.

On 18 October 2016, the Northern Thunder Brigade, part of the Hamza Division, issued an ultimatum to the YPG and the Army of Revolutionaries, warning them to leave Tell Rifaat within 48 hours after which they would attack the town. The threat was not carried out.

2017
On 24 September 2017, the Hamza Division announced the opening of a military academy in the city of al-Bab. According to Abdullah Halawa, the military commander of the group, 2,200 fighters were to undergo two months of training in the academy, with the goal of forming a "Syrian National Army" in northern Syria.

2018
In January 2018, the group participated in Operation Olive Branch, the Turkish Armed Forces' invasion of the Afrin Region, against the YPG-led Syrian Democratic Forces. In February, the Kurdish Falcons Brigade (aka Red Berets) was formed as part of the Hamza Division. Led by Hasan Abdullah Kulli, it claimed to consist of 400 Kurds and 200 Arabs. The TAF and TFSA captured Afrin on 18 March 2018, after SDF fighters withdrew from the city.

On 25 March, Hamza Division fighters killed a commander of Ahrar al-Sharqiya in Afrin in a dispute over territory and spoils of war, resulting in clashes between the two groups. In response, Ahrar al-Sharqiya arrested around 200 Hamza Division fighters. A ceasefire agreement between the two groups was signed on the same day under Turkish supervision.

In June 2018, the Hamza Division assassinated an Ahrar al-Sham commander in al-Bab.

2019
The Hamza Division was among the groups which volunteered to send fighters to Libya, as part of the Turkish military intervention in the Second Libyan Civil War, in December 2019.

2020
In May 2020, the Syrian Observatory for Human Rights reported several deaths of Syrian fighters in Libya, including Hamza members.

On 28 May protestors in Afrin demanded the withdrawal of the Hamza Division from Afrin after several abuses carried out by the group, including holding female prisoners naked. During the protests members of Ahrar al-Sham and Jaysh al-Islam (exiled from East Ghouta), clashed with the Hamza Division at their headquarters and were eventually able to take over the  headquarters, arresting several Hamza Division members in the process. Three Hamza Division members were killed in the course of the confrontation.

2021
On September 9, 2021, five Turkish-supported groups announced that they had merged into the Syrian Front for Liberation. They include the Sultan Suleiman Shah Division, Hamza Division, al-Mutasim Brigade, Suqour al-Sham Brigades and the 20th Division.

References

Anti-government factions of the Syrian civil war
Anti-ISIL factions in Syria
Free Syrian Army
Military units and formations established in 2013
Syrian National Army
Turkish supported militant groups of the Syrian civil war